Archie Brathwaite (born 1918) is a Panamanian former Negro league outfielder who played in the 1940s.

A native of Colón, Panama, Brathwaite made his Negro leagues debut in 1944 with the Newark Eagles. He went on to play two seasons with the Philadelphia Stars in 1947 and 1948, and then spent several seasons in the Mexican League in the 1950s.

References

External links
 and Seamheads

1918 births
Newark Eagles players
Philadelphia Stars players
Baseball outfielders
Panamanian expatriate baseball players in Mexico
Sportspeople from Colón, Panama
Azules de Veracruz players
Indios de Anahuac players
Tecolotes de Nuevo Laredo players
Sultanes de Monterrey players
Panamanian expatriate baseball players in the United States
Possibly living people